Dunn's mud turtle (Kinosternon dunni), also known commonly as the Colombian mud turtle, is a species of turtle in the family Kinosternidae.

Etymology
The epithet or specific name, dunni, honors Emmett Reid Dunn, an American herpetologist.

Geographic range
K. dunni is endemic to Colombia.

Habitat
The preferred natural habitat of K. dunni is freshwater swamps and slow rivers.

References

External links
Tortoise & Freshwater Turtle Specialist Group (1996).  Kinosternon dunni.   2006 IUCN Red List of Threatened Species.   Downloaded on 29 July 2007.

Bibliography

Schmidt KP (1947). "A New Kinosternid Turtle from Colombia". Fieldiana Zoology 31 (13): 109–112. (Kinosternon dunni, new species).

Kinosternon
Endemic fauna of Colombia
Reptiles of Colombia
Vulnerable animals
Vulnerable biota of South America
Reptiles described in 1947
Taxonomy articles created by Polbot